Future Legends is the debut studio album by North Irish progressive rock band Fruupp. Recorded in July 1973 and produced by Denis Taylor, it was released on 5 October in the United Kingdom on the Dawn Records label, a subsidiary of Pye Records for underground and progressive rock music. To promote the album, the band undertook a two-month tour which finished on 29 November with a concert in The Whitla Hall, Belfast where they played with the Ulster Youth Orchestra.

The track "On a Clear Day" written by Stephen Houston featured in the first hundred vinyl pressings of Future Legends but was later withdrawn from the album. It resurfaced as a bonus track in the 2009 Esoteric Recordings remastered edition.

Track listing

Personnel

Fruupp
Peter Farrelly – lead vocals, bass guitar; cover painting
Stephen Houston – keyboards, oboe, vocals; arrangements (including strings)
Vincent McCusker – guitars, vocals
Martin Foye – drums, percussion

Technical personnel
Denis Taylor – producer
Tony Taverner – engineer
Michael Rennie – conductor (strings)
Paul Charles – cover concept
Marie O'Connell – inside photograph

References

Fruupp albums
1973 debut albums